Agar Tum Saath Ho is an Indian television series which aired on Zindagi from 16 October 2016 to 25 March 2017.

Plot 
It is the story of love transcending class differences; the story of Neema and Ravi who belong to two completely different worlds.  Neema, the daughter of an affluent and caring father falls in love with a simple middle class boy Ravi and marries him against her father's wishes. However, her over-protective father showers luxuries on his daughter on his own accord. His constant interference brings in misunderstandings and differences between the couple to the extent that they consider parting ways.  Will class difference and an opposing father destroy the relationship? Or will love prove stronger against all odds?

Cast 
 Vinay Rajput as Shekhar
 Ritu Barmecha as Neema : Ravi's Wife
 Hitesh Bharadwaj as Ravi : Neema's Husband
 Udit Ohri as Kapil 
 Kamal Tewari as Kamal Bharadwaj (Neema's Father)
 Sabina Mehta Jaitley as Sanjana Bharadwaj (Neema's Mother)
 Sarah Hashmi as Reema (Neema's Sister)
 Dolly Ahluwalia as Darshita Bharadwaj (Neema's Aunt)
 Pranav Sachdev as Ram
 Aziz Qureshi as Professor Waqar
 Gurvinder Singh as Bunty
 Rajat Verma as Chandan (Ravi's Brother)
 Rajshree Seem as Ravi's Mother
 Vimi Mehta as Preeto ji
 Simran Kaur  as Jasbir                                          
 Radha Bhat As Zeba

References

Zee Zindagi original programming
2016 Indian television series debuts
2017 Indian television series endings
Indian drama television series
Indian television soap operas